Pandæmonium, Pandemonium or Pandamonium may refer to:

Literature
 Pandæmonium (Paradise Lost), capital of Hell in John Milton's epic poem Paradise Lost
 Pandaemonium (history book), a book by Humphrey Jennings, published posthumously in 1985
 Pandaemonium (novel), a 2009 novel by Christopher Brookmyre
 Pandemonium (novel), a 2012 novel by Lauren Oliver

Film and television
 Pandemonium, a 1971 Japanese film directed by Toshio Matsumoto
 Pandemonium (1982 film), a 1982 American comedy
 Pandemonium (1987 film), Australian horror movie
 Pandaemonium (film), a 2000 UK drama about the poets Coleridge and Wordsworth
 Pandamonium (TV series), a 1982 American animated series
 "Pandemonium" (Kaze no Stigma), an episode of Kaze no Stigma
 Pandemonium, the opening segment of the London 2012 opening ceremony
 "Pandemonium" (The Unit), an episode of The Unit
 "Pandemonium" (The Good Place), an episode of The Good Place
 "Pandemonium", pilot episode of 2022 British sitcom Here We Go (TV series)

Gaming and amusements
Pandemonium (role-playing game), a 1993 comedy role-playing game designed by Stephan Michael Sechi
Pandemonium! (video game), a 1996 platform game
Pandemonium 2, a 1997 platform game and sequel to Pandemonium!
Pandemonium (Dungeons & Dragons), a fictional location in the fantasy role-playing game Dungeons & Dragons
Pandemonium (roller coaster), a roller coaster at several Six Flags parks
Pandamonium (ride), Chinese-themed ride at Dreamworld in Australia

Music 
Pandemonium (band), a 1980s American hard rock/heavy metal band
Pandemonium: the Lost and Found Orchestra, a music-based theatre piece by Luke Cresswell and Steve McNicholas
Pandemonium Tour, a 2009–2010 concert tour by Pet Shop Boys
Pandemonium, a Trinidadian steel band with Ray Holman

Albums
Pandemonium (Cavalera Conspiracy album), 2014
Pandemonium (Chthonic album), 2008
Pandemonium (Gothminister album) or the title song, 2022
Pandemonium (Killing Joke album) or the title song (see below), 1994
Pandemonium (Loudness album) or the title song, 2001
Pandemonium (Pet Shop Boys album) or the title song, 2010
Pandemonium (Pretty Maids album) or the title song, 2010
Pandemonium (The Time album) or the title song, 1990
Pandemonium (Torture Squad album) or the title song, 2003
Pandemonium! (album), by B2K, 2002
Pandemonium – The Singles Collection, by BWO, 2008
Pandemonium (EP), by In Legend, or the title song, 2010
Pandemonium, by Bellowhead, 2015
Pandemonium, by Nigel Eaton, 2002
Pandemonium, by Sic, 2007

Songs
"Pandemonium" (song), by Killing Joke
"Pandemonium", a 1983 single by Pel Mel
"Pandemonium", a 2005 song from the musical The 25th Annual Putnam County Spelling Bee

Technology and science
Pandemonium architecture, an early connectionist AI technique proposed in 1959
Pandemonium effect, a problem that may appear when high resolution detectors are used in beta decay studies
Pandemonium Dorsa, a mountain range on the dwarf planet Pluto

See also
Pandemonia